Jure Matjašič (born 31 May 1992) is a Slovenian football midfielder who plays for Aluminij.

References

External links
NZS profile 

1992 births
Living people
Sportspeople from Maribor
Slovenian footballers
Association football wingers
NK Drava Ptuj players
NK Zavrč players
NK Domžale players
Sacramento Republic FC players
NK Aluminij players
NK Celje players
Slovenian Second League players
Slovenian PrvaLiga players
USL Championship players
Slovenia international footballers
Slovenian expatriate footballers
Slovenian expatriate sportspeople in the United States
Expatriate soccer players in the United States